Robert William Willson (Mertzon, Texas, May 28, 1912 – San Antonio, June 1, 2000) was an American artist and sculptor notable for his creative use of solid glass. He was one of the first Americans to work with solid glass in partnership with the glass blowers of Murano, Italy. 

Educated in the American Southwest and in Mexico, he also studied glass in Murano, Italy. He had an especially close artistic association with Venice, spending thirty-seven summers there making glass sculptures.

Further reading

External links

1912 births
2000 deaths
Sculptors from Texas
American glass artists
Southwestern artists
20th-century American sculptors
20th-century American male artists
American male sculptors